Saphenista solisae is a species of moth of the family Tortricidae. It is found in Tamaulipas, Mexico.

The wingspan is about 9.5 mm. The ground colour of the forewings is cream with indistinct brownish cream suffusions and brownish marginal dots. The markings are brownish yellow. The hindwings are light brownish cream.

Etymology
The species is named in honour of Dr Maria Alma Solis.

References

Moths described in 2007
Saphenista